Prostanthera tozerana is a species of flowering plant that is endemic to Mount Tozer in Queensland. It is a small, compact shrub with hairy branchlets, thick egg-shaped leaves with the narrower end towards the base, and pale purplish-mauve flowers.

Description

Taxonomy
Prostanthera tozerana was first formally described in 2015 by Barry Conn and Trevor Wilson in the journal Telopea, based on plant material collected on the summit of Mount Tozer.

Distribution and habitat
This mintbush is only known from the summit of Mount Tozer in the Iron Range in far north Queensland, where it grows in exposed situations amongst boulders.

Conservation status
Prostanthera tozerana is classified as "critically endangered" under the Queensland Government Nature Conservation Act 1992.

References

tozerana
Flora of Queensland
Lamiales of Australia
Plants described in 2015
Taxa named by Barry John Conn